Mike Moloney may refer to:

 Mike Moloney (Gaelic footballer) (born 1988), Gaelic footballer for Kerry
 Mike Moloney (politician) (born 1941), American politician in Kentucky

See also
 Mick Moloney (born 1944), Irish musician and scholar
 Michael Joseph Moloney (1912–1991), Irish-born priest in Gambia